Joel Kiviranta (born March 23, 1996) is a Finnish professional ice hockey forward for the Dallas Stars of the National Hockey League (NHL).

Playing career
On November 12, 2013, Kiviranta made his Liiga debut playing with Jokerit against the Espoo Blues during the 2013–14 Liiga season.

In the 2018–19 Liiga season, his fifth year with Vaasan Sport, Kiviranta tallied 31 points in 48 games. His 16 goals were third on the team however he was unable to propel Sport to the post-season.

Undrafted, Kiviranta used his NHL-out clause with Sport to sign a two-year, entry-level contract with the Dallas Stars on June 1, 2019. His first NHL goal was an even strength goal against the New Jersey Devils on February 1, 2020, against the goaltender Louis Domingue to give the Dallas Stars a 2–1 lead, and they went on to win the game in overtime 3–2.

On September 4, 2020, Kiviranta substituted in for injured Stars forward Andrew Cogliano in the seventh and decisive game of the Second Round of the 2020 Stanley Cup playoffs against the Colorado Avalanche. He helped send the Stars into the Conference Finals by scoring a hat-trick, including the game-winning overtime goal.

On July 31, 2021, the Stars re-signed Kiviranta to a two-year, $2.1 million contract extension.

International play

Kiviranta was selected to make his senior international debut with Finland at the 2019 IIHF World Championship held in Bratislava, Slovakia. He finished with 2 goals and 3 points in 9 games to help Finland claim the gold medal in a victory over Canada on May 26, 2019.

Career statistics

Regular season and playoffs

International

References

External links
 

1996 births
Living people
Dallas Stars players
Finnish ice hockey forwards
Ice hockey players at the 2012 Winter Youth Olympics
Jokerit players
Kokkolan Hermes players
Sportspeople from Vantaa
Texas Stars players
Undrafted National Hockey League players
Vaasan Sport players
Youth Olympic gold medalists for Finland